Arnold Robert Moser (August 9, 1915 – August 15, 2002) was a pinch hitter in Major League Baseball. He played for the Cincinnati Reds.

References

External links

1915 births
2002 deaths
Major League Baseball pitchers
Cincinnati Reds players
Baseball players from Houston
Nashville Vols players